The Lac La Ronge Indian Band is a Woodland Cree First Nation in northern Saskatchewan, it is the largest Cree band government in Canada and the largest First Nation in Saskatchewan. The administrative centre of the Lac La Ronge Indian Band is located in La Ronge.

History
La Ronge & Stanley Mission Band of Woods Cree Indians became a signatory to the Treaty 6 on February 11, 1889, signed by Chief James Roberts. In 1900 Peter Ballantyne was allowed to separate from the La Ronge and Stanley Mission Band to form the Peter Ballantyne Band of Cree Indians, the predecessor to the Peter Ballantyne Cree Nation. In 1910, the La Ronge & Stanley Mission Band split into two entities: Amos Charles Band of Cree Indians  (located in Stanley Mission) and the James Roberts Band of Cree Indians (located in La Ronge).  In 1950, the two Bands amalgamated and became the Lac La Ronge Indian Band, the current legal name.

Reserves and communities

Reserves
Lac La Ronge Indian Band's land-base consists of 18 Indian reserves, some containing one of six communities:

 Bittern Lake 218—
 Four Portages 157C—
 Fox Point 157D—
 Fox Point 157E—
 Grandmother's Bay 219——containing the community of Grandmother's Bay
 Kitsakie 156B—
 Lac La Ronge 156——containing the community of La Ronge
 Little Hills 158—
 Little Hills 158A—
 Little Hills 158B—
 Little Red River 106C——containing the community of Little Red River
 originally 
 in 1935, additional  reserved
 Little Red River 106D—
 Morin Lake 217——containing the community of Hall Lake
 originally 
 in 1973, additional  reserved
 Old Fort 157B—
 Potato River 156A—
 Stanley 157——containing the community of Stanley Mission
 Stanley 157A—
 Sucker River 156C——containing the community of Sucker River

The communities of Stanley Mission, Grandmother's Bay and Little Red River are self-administered. This arrangement ensures that these communities have more control over their services and programs.

Communities
 Lac La Ronge — on Lac La Ronge 156
 Little Red River  — on Little Red River 106C as well as Montreal Lake Nation's Montreal Lake 106B Reserve
 Hall Lake — on Morin Lake 217
 Morin Lake — on Morin Lake 217
 Sucker River — on Sucker River 156C
 Stanley Mission — on Stanley 157
 Grandmother's Bay — on Grandmother's Bay 219

Governance 
The First Nation elects their Council under the Custom Electoral System, consisting of a chief and 12 councillors. The current Council consists of Chief Tammy Cook-Searson and Councillors Devin Bernachez, Michael Bird, Linda Charles, Jimmy Charles, John Halkett, Gerald McKenzie, Keith Mirasty, Ann Ratt, Norman Ross, John Roberts, Sam Roberts, and Dennis Sanderson.

See also
 List of First Nations peoples
 Federation of Sovereign Indigenous Nations

References

External links

First Nations governments in Saskatchewan
Cree governments